Judy Erwin (born March 7, 1950) is a former American politician, educator, and public relations executive.

Born in Detroit, Michigan, Erwin received her bachelor's degree in education from University of Wisconsin–Whitewater and her master's degree from National Louis University. She also did graduate work at University of Illinois at Chicago and at the John F. Kennedy School of Government. Erwin was a public school teacher and a public relations executive. She lived in Chicago, Illinois. Erwin was involved in the Democratic Party. From 1993 to 2003, Erwin served in the Illinois House of Representatives.

Notes

1950 births
Living people
Politicians from Detroit
Politicians from Chicago
University of Wisconsin–Whitewater alumni
University of Illinois Chicago alumni
National Louis University alumni
Harvard Kennedy School alumni
Educators from Illinois
American women educators
American public relations people
Women state legislators in Illinois
Democratic Party members of the Illinois House of Representatives
Educators from Michigan
21st-century American women